Kirsten Marie Bråten Berg (born 7 January 1950 in Arendal, Norway) is a Norwegian traditional folk singer, silversmith and government scholar. She is currently living in Valle in the Setesdal area of southern Norway. She trained as a silversmith at the Torleiv H. Bjørgums Vocational College (Oslo Yrkesskole an Torleiv H. Bjørgums) in Setesdal and then set up her own workshop there, in Nomeland.

She began singing traditional Norwegian folk songs in the 1970s and since the late 1970s has given concerts and made recordings, winning Spellemannprisen awards (the Norwegian equivalent of the Grammy award) in 1979 and 1988. She met the bass player Arild Andersen in 1990 and became a member of his group in 1992.

Bråten Berg's interest in the Norwegian folksong tradition has led her to meet and learn from older Norwegian musicians and people or from recordings of their music-making. Alongside figures such fiddler Hallvard Bjørgum, she exemplifies those Norwegian folk musicians trying to carry their tradition into modern times.

In 2005, she was made a Knight First Class of The Royal Norwegian Order of St. Olav in recognition of her work as a performer and ambassador of Norwegian culture.

She has also collaborated with West African musicians on the CD From Senegal to Setesdal.

Honors 
1988: Spellemannprisen in the class Traditional music, for the album Min kvedarlund
1991: Gammlengprisen in the class Vocal music
1993: Spellemannprisen in the class Music for children, for the album Våre beste barnesanger 2
1997: Radka Toneff Memorial Award
2005: Knight First Class of The Royal Norwegian Order of St. Olav

Select discography 
1979: Slinkombas
1980: Kirsten Bråten Berg
1982: Slinkombas og bas igjen
1984: SetesDalarna
1988: Min kvedarlund
1991: Joletid
1992: Sagn 1992 
1993: Suede et Norvège
1993: Arv
1993: Våre beste barnesanger 2
1993: Cohen på norsk
1996: Pilgrimen
1997: Frå Senegal til Setesdal
1997: From Senegal to Setesdal (Six Degrees Records, San Francisco)
1999: Smak av himmel, spor av jord
2000: Runarstreng
2001: Syng du mi røyst
2005: Stemmenes skygge (Heilo), with Marilyn Mazur and Lena Willemark
2007: Stev for dagen, with Astri Rysstad and Kari Rolfsen 
2010: Songen
2012: Nordic Woman
2021: Kvitravn, with Wardruna

References

External links 
 Brief biography at New Albion Records' website (includes portrait photograph).
 Recordings released by Grappa Music.

1950 births
Living people
Norwegian women singers
Norwegian folk singers
Norwegian silversmiths
Spellemannprisen winners
Grappa Music artists
Heilo Music artists
Women metalsmiths
People from Valle, Norway